Ballymacgibbon Cairn is a cairn and National Monument located in County Mayo, Ireland.

Location

History

Ballymacgibbon Cairn has never been excavated, but is believed to have been constructed in the Neolithic.

William Wilde claimed that the cairn was erected by the mythical king Eochaid mac Eirc to celebrate Battle of Moytura.

Description

It is surrounded by a low mound, and kerbstones are visible in several places, one of which has some interesting lines or scratches. The sides are very steep and the top is flat, indicating that it almost certainly contains a passage grave.

There is the remains of a lime kiln attached to the north side of the monument.

References

National Monuments in County Mayo
Archaeological sites in County Mayo